The Crown Family School of Social Work, Policy and Practice, formerly called the School of Social Service Administration (SSA), is the school of social work at the University of Chicago.

History
The school was founded in 1903 by minister and social work educator Graham Taylor as the Social Science Center for Practical Training in Philanthropic and Social Work. By 1920, through the efforts of founding mothers Edith Abbott, Grace Abbott and Sophonisba Breckinridge, along with other notable trustees such as social worker Jane Addams and philanthropist Julius Rosenwald, the school merged with the University of Chicago as one of its graduate schools. It became known from that point forward as the School of Social Service Administration. The campus building the school occupies was designed by famed modernist architect Ludwig Mies van der Rohe.

On January 27, 2021, the university announced that following a $75 million gift from James Crown and Paula Crown, the SSA was renamed the Crown Family School of Social Work, Policy, and Practice.

Programs
The school offers both a master’s-level program and a doctoral-level program in the social sciences. The master’s program lasts two years and can be pursued either full or part-time. It awards graduates with an A.M. degree in social work. The doctoral program awards graduating candidates with a Ph.D.

Rankings
The SSA is ranked as the best social work graduate program in the Gourman Report and third by US News.

See also
Social Service Review

References

External links
 
Guide to the University of Chicago School of Social Service Administration Office of the Dean, Alton Linford, Records 1956-1969 at the University of Chicago Special Collections Research Center
Guide to the University of Chicago School of Social Service Administration Office of the Dean, Harold Richman, Records 1969-1978 at the University of Chicago Special Collections Research Center
Guide to the University of Chicago School of Social Service Administration Office of the Dean, Leon Carroll Marshall, Edith Abbott, and Helen R. Wright, Records 1920-1956 at the University of Chicago Special Collections Research Center
Guide to the University of Chicago School of Social Service Administration Photographs 1935-1983 at the University of Chicago Special Collections Research Center
Guide to the University of Chicago School of Social Service Administration WIN Program Records 1969-1973 at the University of Chicago Special Collections Research Center
Guide to the University of Chicago School of Social Service Administration WIN Program Records 1969-1973 at the University of Chicago Special Collections Research Center

Educational institutions established in 1920
School of Social Service Administration
Schools of social work in the United States
1920 establishments in Illinois